The Philippine Institute of Sports Multi-Purpose Arena or PhilSports Arena is an indoor sporting arena located inside the PhilSports Complex in Pasig, Philippines. It was formerly known as the University of Life Theater and Recreational Arena or the ULTRA. The arena is part of the PhilSports Complex which is maintained by the Philippine Sports Commission.

It was the site of the majority of the games of the Philippine Basketball Association from 1985 to 1992 and from 1999 to 2002. The league still occasionally comes back to play at the arena. The arena was also the home court of the Pasig-Rizal Pirates in the Metropolitan Basketball Association in 1998 and the San Juan Knights in 1999.

History 

When the arena was opened in 1985, the Philippine Basketball Association became the main tenants of the arena after nine years at the Araneta Coliseum. The venue attracted standing-room only crowds during their stay. The league stayed for seven years until they moved to the newly built Cuneta Astrodome in 1993, citing the venue's lack of maintenance.

The arena was supposed to be the staging site of the now-defunct early afternoon ABS-CBN game show Wowowee on February 4, 2006, during its first anniversary but became the site of a deadly stampede that killed 74 people and injured hundreds. Crowds of people from middle class to mostly lower class camped outside the stadium for days to win the large prizes given out during the show. At the time the gates opened, the crowd grew impatient, started shoving, making the gates give way and crushing people in the front of the queue. As of today, the cause of the stampede is still being determined pending investigation.

When Tropical Storm Ondoy and Typhoon Pepeng struck the Philippines in 2009, some evacuees took shelter in the arena.

The 2011 FIBA Asia Champions Cup was held in the arena, where Mahram Tehran defeated Sporting Al Riyadi Beirut in the final. Smart Gilas finished fourth in the tournament, losing to Mahram in the semifinals.

It is also the host venue of the 2015 Asian U23 Women's Volleyball Championship held last May 1–9, 2015.

The arena was renovated and given a major facelift in time for the 2019 Southeast Asian Games as the designated venue for the men's and women's volleyball competition.

Notable events at the PhilSports Arena

 2009 Nike Asia Tour
 2011 FIBA Asia Champions Cup
 2015 Asian U23 Women's Volleyball Championship
 2015 Spike For Peace International Beach Volleyball Tournament
 2019 Southeast Asian Games
 2022 Asian Women's Volleyball Cup

See also
Philippine Sports Commission

References

External links
Philippine Sports Commission website

Sports venues in Metro Manila
Indoor arenas in the Philippines
Basketball venues in the Philippines
ASEAN Basketball League venues
Buildings and structures in Pasig
Volleyball venues in the Philippines